Hygrocybe punicea is a species of agaric (gilled mushroom) in the family Hygrophoraceae. It has been given the recommended English name of crimson waxcap. The species has a European distribution, occurring mainly in agriculturally unimproved grassland. Threats to its habitat have resulted in the species being assessed as globally "vulnerable" on the IUCN Red List of Threatened Species. Records of H. punicea from North America (where it is called scarlet waxy cap and occurs in woodland), East Asia, and Australia require further research to see if they represent the same species.

Taxonomy
The species was first described in 1821 by Swedish mycologist Elias Magnus Fries as Agaricus puniceus, the Latin "puniceus" meaning "blood red". German mycologist Paul Kummer transferred it to the genus Hygrocybe in 1871.

Recent molecular research, based on cladistic analysis of DNA sequences, has confirmed that Hygrocybe punicea belongs in Hygrocybe sensu stricto.

Description
Basidiocarps are agaricoid, up to 150 mm (6 in) tall, the cap convex to broadly umbonate becoming flat, up to 150 mm (6 in) across. The cap surface is smooth, greasy to viscid, dull dark red to crimson becoming pale yellow to buff in places when dry. The lamellae (gills) are waxy, dark red to buff with purple tints and yellowish margin. The stipe (stem) is smooth but fibrillose and streaky, yellow to orange-red, whitish towards base, lacking a ring. The spore print is white, the spores (under a microscope) smooth, inamyloid, ellipsoid, measuring about 8.5 to 10 by 4.5 to 5.5 μm.

Similar species
The European Hygrocybe splendidissima (Spendid Waxcap) can be almost as large, but is scarlet, has a dry cap and non-fibrillose stipe, and has a distinct honey smell when rubbed or when drying. The north temperate Hygrocybe coccinea (Scarlet Waxcap) is also scarlet, but normally much smaller than H. punicea and has a non-fibrillose stipe and a cap that is finely nodulose under a lens.

Distribution and habitat
The Crimson Waxcap is widespread but generally rare throughout Europe. Like most other European waxcaps, it occurs in old, agriculturally unimproved, short-sward grassland (pastures and lawns). 

Recent research suggests waxcaps are neither mycorrhizal nor saprotrophic but may be associated with mosses.

Conservation
Hygrocybe punicea is typical of waxcap grasslands, a declining habitat due to changing agricultural practices. As a result, the species is of global conservation concern and is listed as "vulnerable" on the IUCN Red List of Threatened Species. Hygrocybe punicea also appears on the official or provisional national red lists of threatened fungi in several European countries, including Bulgaria,  Croatia, Czech Republic, Denmark, Estonia,  Germany, and Sweden.

See also

List of Hygrocybe species
List of fungi by conservation status

References

External links
California Fungi page on Hygrocybe punicea

Punicea
Fungi of Europe
Taxa named by Elias Magnus Fries
Fungi described in 1821
Hygrophoraceae